Charles Farrar is an American songwriter, composer, and producer, best known for his songwriting work with vocal groups SWV, 702, Today, and Shades. In the late 1990s/early 2000s, Farrar, alongside Troy Taylor, was a member of "The Characters": a production duo that worked on Boyz II Men's Cooleyhighharmony, as well as with Kenny Lattimore and numerous other artists.

Songwriting and production credits 
Credits are courtesy of Discogs, Spotify, and AllMusic.

Awards and nominations

References 

African-American songwriters
American rhythm and blues singer-songwriters
Living people
African-American record producers
Year of birth missing (living people)